Unica may refer to:
 Unica (material), a vulcanised lump paper material
 Unica (La India album), 2010
 Unica (Ornella Vanoni album), 2021
 Unica (river), a karst river of Slovenia
 Unica Corporation, a manufacturer of enterprise marketing management software
 Mateba Model 6 Unica or Mateba Autorevolver, a semiautomatic revolver developed by Mateba
 Unica Zürn (1916–1970), German author and artist
 Unica (typeface)
 Abbas Ali Atwi, also known as Unica, a Lebanese football player

See also
UNICA (disambiguation)
Unitsa, a Russian village